A Spontaneous Unaffiliated Volunteer (SUV) or Event-Based Volunteer refers to an individual who volunteers to assist community members or community organizations, typically after a large-scale or well-publicized disaster. Because unaffiliated volunteers lack consistent training, and each volunteer's trustworthiness is unknown, SUV management can be very difficult, and the subject of a large amount of research and practice.

In many community organizing circles, the term "Community Volunteer" is preferred, emphasizing the community-centric nature of unaffiliated volunteerism.

References

Disaster management
Emergency management
Volunteering